Nocardia veterana is a species of bacteria from the genus Nocardia that has been isolated from human bronchial lavage.

References

Mycobacteriales
Bacteria described in 2022